The Scullabogue massacre was an atrocity committed in Scullabogue, near Newbawn, County Wexford, Ireland on 5 June 1798, during the 1798 rebellion. Rebels massacred up to 200 noncombatant men, women and children, most of whom were Protestant, who were held prisoner in a barn which was then set alight. A participant in the rebellion, General Thomas Cloney, put the death count at 100.

Background

A farm and out-buildings in the townland of Scullabogue (also spelled Scullaboge) were used as a staging post for rebel forces before the 1798 Battle of New Ross. The main camp for the rebels was located a mile from Scullabogue on top of Carrigbyrne Hill. 
The rebels had rounded perceived loyalists of both sexes and all ages who were mainly held in a barn to prevent their supplying the military with intelligence of rebel movements. At dawn on 5 June, the bulk of the rebel army attacked the nearby town of New Ross leaving behind a small number of guards in charge of the captives. The battle at New Ross was a heavy defeat for the rebels who lost almost 3,000 men. Survivors who had fled the fighting had reached Scullabogue with news of the terrible losses while the battle still raged.

Massacre

Thomas Cloney, a rebel commander with the rank of General, present at the Battle of New Ross, reported:

The news had incensed certain elements of the rebel force stationed at Scullabogue, who joined with the deserters in agitating for revenge against the prisoners. The prisoners' guards twice prevented the gathering mob from harming them but eventually gave in to the crowd by allowing the executions by musket-shot of over a dozen particularly hated individuals. However, all semblance of control was quickly lost and the barn was soon torched. People trying to escape the barn were shot, stabbed and beaten to death or forced back into the flames.

Only two men are thought to have escaped the flames of Scullabogue Barn. One was named Richard Grandy, and the other was Loftus Frizzel. At least twelve, and possibly thirteen men alleged to have taken part in the massacre were executed after the rebellion was suppressed; a further two were transported. Although the massacre has been presented in some sources as sectarian in origin, up to 20 of the victims were loyalist Catholics, and three of the seventeen rebel guards linked directly with the massacre by subsequent depositions (John Ellard, John Turner and Robert Mills) were Protestants. Mills gave detailed evidence on the activities of the other guards, and was set free despite having admitted personally attacking prisoners with his pike.

Memorials
There is a Scullabogue Memorial stone in the graveyard of Old Ross Church of Ireland church. The theme is one of reconciliation. The Scullabogue Barn itself was controversially knocked down and covered over by the current proprietor in the 1990s.  There is, however, no state memorial to the people who were massacred during this incident.

See also
List of massacres in Ireland

References

Massacres of the Irish Rebellion of 1798
New Ross